is a Japanese model, actress and J-pop singer. She was the youngest member of the group CoCo.

Life and career
Ohno was born on 17 June 1974 in Chiba Prefecture, Japan. As a teenager, she was a finalist at the 2nd Japan Bishōjo Contest, a beauty pageant held in 1988. Ohno joined the Japanese J-pop girl group CoCo in 1989 and remained with them until the group's dissolution in September 1994. While still with CoCo, she also released single works in 1992 and 1993.

In 1997 she had the starring role in the V-cinema Zero Woman: Kesenai kioku, part of the long-running Zero Woman series.

Filmography
 Zero Woman: Kesenai kioku (1997 aka Zero Woman: The Hunted) – Rei

Discography

Singles 
 1 July 1992: 	Yurushite....
 21 May 1993: 	Furueru Kesshin

Picture books 
 6 September 1993: NOVA LUNA
 2 June 1995: The Wind Rose
 1 March 1996: True Blue
 25 October 1997: Scarlet

See also 
 Coco

References

External links

1974 births
Living people
Japanese actresses
Musicians from Chiba Prefecture
Japanese women pop singers
Japanese female idols
21st-century Japanese singers
21st-century Japanese women singers